Joachim is a given name, derived from the Hebrew Yehoyaqim, meaning "raised by Yahweh".

People 
 Jehoiakim (c. 635–597 BC), king of Judah, from whom all later versions of the name are directly or indirectly derived
 Jehoiachin, king of Judah and son of Jehoiakim
 Joachim, a Saint in the Roman Catholic and Eastern Orthodox traditions. He was the father of Mary, the mother of Jesus
 Joachim of Fiore (c. 1135–1202),  Italian monk, founder of the heretical "Three Ages" theory
 Joachim Gutkeled (c.1240–1277), Hungarian baron
 Joachim I Nestor, Elector of Brandenburg (1484–1535), German member of the Hohenzollern
 Patriarch Joachim I of Constantinople, reigned 1498–1502,1504
 Joachim II Hector, Elector of Brandenburg (1505–1571)
 Joachim du Bellay (1522–1560), French poet
 Patriarch Joachim of Moscow (1620–1690), the eleventh Patriarch of Moscow and All Russia
 Joachim Perinet (1763–1816), Austrian dramatist
 Prince Joachim Murat (1767–1815), Marshal of the Empire, Grand Duke of Berg and King of Naples
 Otto Joachim Moltke (1770–1853), Danish politician and Minister of State
 Joachim Patrikios (1786–1868), born in Ithaca, Greece, a Saint in the Eastern Orthodox tradition
 Joseph Joachim Raff (1822–1882), German-Swiss composer, teacher and pianist
 Patriarch Joachim II of Constantinople, reigned 1860–1863, 1873–1878
 Joachim, 4th Prince Murat (1834–1901), Major-General in the French Army
 Ecumenical Patriarch Joachim III of Constantinople (1834–1912)
 Joachim (Levitsky) (1853–c.1921), Russian Orthodox bishop and religious writer
 Joachim, 5th Prince Murat (1856–1932), member of the Bonaparte-Murat family
 Joachim Ringelnatz (1883–1934), pen name of German author and painter Hans Bötticher
 Joachim Albrecht Eggeling (1884–1945), German Nazi SS officer
 Joachim, 6th Prince Murat (1885–1938), member of the Bonaparte-Murat family
 Prince Joachim of Prussia (1890–1920), German royal
 Joachim Stutschewsky (1891–1982), Ukraine-born Austrian and Israeli cellist
 Joachim von Ribbentrop (1893–1946), German Nazi foreign minister and war criminal
 Joachim Ziegler (1905–1948), German Nazi SS commander
 Joachim Mrugowsky (1905–1948), German Nazi doctor executed for war crimes
 Joachim Gruppelaar (1911–1971), Dutch Olympic equestrian
 Joachim Rumohr (1911–1971), German Nazi SS commander
 Joachim Hamann (1913–1945), Baltic-German Holocaust perpetrator
 Joachim Peiper (1915–1976), German war criminal and SS leader
 Joachim Rønneberg (1919–2018), member of the Gunnerside team of the sabotage of the heavy water plant at Vemork
 Joachim-Ernst Berendt (1922–2000), German jazz journalist
 Joachim Fest (1926–2006), German historian, writer on Nazi Germany including an important biography of Adolf Hitler
 Joachim Fuchsberger (1927–2014), German actor and television host 
 Joachim, Count of Schönburg-Glauchau (1929–1998), German count
 Joachim Wendler (1939–1975), German aquanaut
 Joachim Gauck (born 1940), President of Germany 2012–2017
 Joachim, 8th Prince Murat (born 1944), current head of the Murat family
 Joachim Sauer (born 1949), German scientist
 Joachim Witt (born 1949), German musician and actor 
 Joachim Kroll (1933–1991), German serial killer, rapist, and cannibal
 Hans-Joachim Stuck (born 1951), German motor racing driver
 Joachim Löw (born 1960), German football coach and former manager of the German national team
 Joachim Nagel (born 1966), German economist and current President of the Bundesbank
 Joachim Garraud, (born 1968), French DJ
 Prince Joachim of Denmark (born 1969)
 Joachim Stamp (born 1970), German politician
 Joachim Björklund (born 1971), Swedish football player
 Joachim, Prince of Pontecorvo (born 1973), member of the Bonaparte-Murat family
 Joachim Johansson (born 1982), Swedish tennis player
 Prince Joachim of Belgium, Archduke of Austria-Este (born 1991)

Fictional characters 
 Joachim (Star Trek), a villain from the Star Trek episode "Space Seed" and the movie Star Trek II: The Wrath of Khan
Joachim, the Norwegian protagonist of Jostein Gaarder's novel The Christmas Mystery
Elder Joachim, a high-ranking member of the Panarii religion and mentor to the character Virgil in the 2001 video game Arcanum: Of Steamworks and Magick Obscura
Joachim de Wett, a Nilfgaardian commander in The Witcher series
Joachim Armster, the vampiric boss of the Dark Palace of Waterfalls in the Castlevania: Lament of Innocence video game

Other language forms 
 Albanian: Gjokë (def.), Gjoka (indef.)
 Armenian: Hovakim (Հովակիմ)
 Basque: Jokin, Iokin
 Catalan: Joaquim, Quim, Ximo (in Valencian)
 Czech: Jáchym
 Danish, Finnish, Norwegian, Swedish: Joakim
 Dutch: Jochem, Jogchum, Jochen, Joachim
 French: Joachim
 Galician: Xaquín
 German: Joachim, Jochen, Achim
 Greek: Iōākeím
 Hungarian: Joakim
 Icelandic: Jóakim
 Irish: Ioaichím
 Italian: Gioacchino
 Maltese: Ġwakkin
 Murcian: Iacin, Juaqui, Quino
 Polish: Joachim
 Portuguese: Joaquim (short forms: Jaquim, Quim, Quincas)
 Romanian: Ioachim
 Russian: Ioakim, Akim
 Serbian: Joakim, Jakim, Akim, Aćim, Jaćim, and diminutives.
 Spanish: Joaquín
 Swedish: Joakim, Joacim, Joachim

See also 
 Joachim (surname)
 Patriarch Joachim (disambiguation)
 Prince Joachim (disambiguation)
 Hakim (name)
 Joakim
 Joaquim
 Joaquín

References 

Masculine given names
German masculine given names